This article is part of the history of rail transport by country series

The history of rail transport in Malawi began shortly after the turn of the twentieth century.

Transport by rail was introduced to British Central Africa Protectorate (BCA), the British protectorate occupying present-day Malawi, in 1904. Three years later, the name of the area was changed to Nyasaland.

Railways have continued to serve the area ever since, including in the period since Malawi became independent in 1964.

British colonial period

Background 

Shire Highlands Railway 
Low Shire River levels after 1896 made water transport more difficult. In 1901, the Shire Highlands Railway Company was formed by Blantyre-based investors.  It soon obtained a concession to build a railway from Port Herald (now Nsanje) on the Shire River at the southernmost point of the protectorate, to Fort Johnston (now Mangochi), at the southern end of Lake Nyasa, via Chiromo and Blantyre.  The first section of this line, between Port Herald and Chiromo, was handed over to traffic on 1 September 1904.

The difficulties were so severe that the Shire Highlands Railway ran out of funds, with the consequence that another company, the British South Africa Company, assumed the task of completing the section, which was finally opened on 23 January 1909. Additional reductions in the Shire River's flow made Port Herald unsatisfactory, so a Zambezi port was needed.

Central African Railway 
From there, goods went by river steamers to Chinde then by sea to Beira, involving three transhipments and delays. The Central African Railway was poorly built, and soon needed extensive repairs.

Trans-Zambezia Railway 
In the early 20th century, Beira developed as a major port: it was far superior to Chinde, which was severely damaged by a cyclone in 1922. The Trans-Zambezia Railway, constructed between 1919 and 1922, ran  from the south bank of the Zambezi to join the main line from Beira to Rhodesia. Its promoters had interests in Beira port, and they ignored its high cost and limited benefit to Nyasaland or a shorter alternative route to the small port of Quelimane. River transport was practically defunct after 1935. The only recorded traffic on the Shire River within Nyasaland was a seasonal service run by the Shire Highlands Railway for the collection of cotton and other produce between Chiromo and Chikwawa.

Nyasaland Railways Limited 
The Zambezi crossing remained the weak point in the link to Beira. The ferry used old steamers towing barges between Chindio on the north bank and Muracca on the south bank, and its capacity was limited. For two months a year the river was too shallow, at other times it flooded.

In 1930, Nyasaland Railways Limited was formed. The new company acquired the Shire Highlands Railway and Central African Railway, and made plans to extend the railway north and south.

The northern extension from Blantyre to Salima near Lake Nyasa was also completed in 1935, and a terminal for lake services was developed at the nearby lake port of Chipoka. The government turned over operation of lake services to Nyasaland Railways, who operated cargo and passenger services between ports on the lake.

After the completion of the Dona Ana bridge, connecting the railway sections of Malawi and Mozambique became possible. When the sections were finally connected, the line between Dondo (Mozambique) and Blantyre (Malawi) was named Sena railway.

Colonial railway operations 
Unfortunately, the Zambezi Bridge and northern extension to Lake Nyasa created less traffic than anticipated, and it was only in 1946 that the traffic levels predicted in 1937 were reached. By this time, motor transport was becoming an alternative to rail, but government regulations designed to promote the use of the railway hindered the development of road transport. All the rail lines were narrow gauge and single track, and the Shire Highlands Railway in particular had sharp curves and steep gradients, so the system was inadequate for heavy train loads. Maintenance costs were high and freight volumes were low, so freight rates were up to three times those of Rhodesian and East African lines.

Independent Malawi
Upon independence, Nyasaland Railways changed its name to Malawi Railways Limited.

On 17 May 1968 work began on a 101 km rail extension to connect Malawi Railways to the existing Nacala railway in Mozambique, to give Malawi access to the seaport of Nacala in northern Mozambique. The new railway connected to Malawi's north–south line at Nkaya, and to the existing Nacala line at Nova Freixo in Mozambique (present-day Cuamba). The line was inaugurated by President Hastings Banda on 4 July 1970 and began operations on 3 August. The project cost £5.4 million, financed by a long-term, low-interest loan from the Industrial Development Corporation of South Africa. An extension of the Sena railway, starting from the city Salima, towards the west, reaching Lilongwe and Mchinji, was completed in 1979. 

Although costly and inefficient, the rail link to Beira remained a main bulk transport link until 1979 when it was destroyed by RENAMO forces in the Mozambican Civil War. By then, Malawi had its second rail link to the Mozambique port of Nacala. In 1984 the Nacala link was also lost, when the Nacala railway was destroyed by RENAMO forces.

Lake services were separated from Malawi Railways in 1994.

The Nacala railway link was later restored, and is Malawi's principal route for imports and exports today. In 2017, the Nacala railway link was extended west from Nkaya junction to the coal mines at Moatize in Mozambique.

See also

Eugene Sharrer
History of Malawi
Rail transport in Malawi

References

Notes

Bibliography

External links
 illustrated account of the railways of Nyasaland

Malawi
Rail
Rail transport in Malawi

de:Schienenverkehr in Malawi#Geschichte